Jenkinson is a surname. Notable people with the surname include:

Anthony Jenkinson (1529–1610/1611), English explorer
Jenkinson Baronets, holders of the two British baronetcies for people with the surname Jenkinson
Charles Jenkinson, 1st Earl of Liverpool
Robert Jenkinson, 2nd Earl of Liverpool
Charles Jenkinson, 3rd Earl of Liverpool
Carl Jenkinson (born 1992), English footballer
Clay S. Jenkinson (born 1955), American author
David Jenkinson (1934–2004), English railway modeller and historian
Debbie Jenkinson, Irish illustrator and comic artist
Denis Jenkinson (1921–1997), English motorsport journalist
Hilary Jenkinson (1882-1961), English archivist
Kate Jenkinson, Australian actress
Leigh Jenkinson (born 1969), English footballer
Louisa Jenkinson, Countess of Liverpool (1767–1821), first wife of Robert Jenkinson, 2nd Earl of Liverpool
Mary Jenkinson, Countess of Liverpool (1777–1846), second wife of Robert Jenkinson, 2nd Earl of Liverpool
Philip Jenkinson (1935–2012), English journalist, television presenter and film collector
Robert Jenkinson (canoeist) (born 1960), New Zealand canoeist
Thomas Jenkinson (MP) (fl. 16th century), English member of Parliament for Leicester
Tom Jenkinson (footballer) (born 1865), Scottish footballer (Heart of Midlothian and Scotland)
Thomas Jenkinson (English footballer) (fl. 1914–1916), English footballer (Bradford City)
Thomas Jenkinson (footballer, born 1877), English footballer (Sheffield United, Grimsby Town)
Tom Jenkinson (musician) (born 1975), British recording artist
William Jenkinson (footballer, born 1892), English footballer
William Jenkinson (footballer, born 1883), English footballer

See also
Warner-Jenkinson Company, Inc. v. Hilton Davis Chemical Co.
A. W. Jenkinson Forest Products, UK based forestry company
Jenkinson, UK based cleaning chemical manufacturers, working predominantly within the food industry

See also
Jenkin
Jenkins (disambiguation)

English-language surnames
Patronymic surnames
Surnames from given names